Elections to Wolverhampton Metropolitan Borough Council were held on 2 May 1996. One third of the council was up for election and the Labour Party retained overall control of the Council, gaining seven seats at the expense of the Conservative group.

Composition

Prior to the election, the composition of the council was:

Labour Party 39
Conservative Party 19
Liberal Democrat 2

After the election, the composition of the council was:

Labour Party 46
Conservative Party 12
Liberal Democrat 2

Election result

Ward results

1996
1996 English local elections
1990s in the West Midlands (county)